The 2012 Melbourne Vixens season saw Melbourne Vixens compete in the 2012 ANZ Championship. With a team captained by Bianca Chatfield and featuring Madison Browne, Julie Corletto and Geva Mentor, Vixens finished the season as minor premiers. In the major semi-final they defeated  Northern Mystics 56–50. This was the first ever netball match held at Rod Laver Arena. However they lost the grand final 41–38 to Waikato Bay of Plenty Magic and finished the season as runners-up. After five years as head coach of Vixens, Julie Hoornweg announced her retirement at the end of the 2012 season.

Players

Player movements

Squad

Notes
  Kelsey Browne was called up as a temporary replacement player for Round 1 and Round 2. 
  Kelsey Browne, Ashlee Howard, Kara Richards and Micaela Wilson were also members of the 2012 Victorian Fury squad.

Milestones
 Karyn Howarth made her ANZ Championship debut in Round 1 against Queensland Firebirds.
 Julie Corletto and Madison Browne both made their 50th ANZ Championship appearances in Round 5 against Queensland Firebirds.
 Chelsey Tregear made her 50th ANZ Championship appearance in Round 14 against  Southern Steel. Tregear subsequently announced her retirement at the Vixens awards ceremony.

Tauranga Pre-Season Tournament
On 2, 3 and 4 March, Waikato Bay of Plenty Magic hosted a pre-season tournament at the TECT Arena in Tauranga. For the first time since 2008, all ten ANZ Championship teams competed at the same tournament. The ten teams were divided into two pools of five. Teams within each pool played each other once and the winners qualified for the final. Melbourne Vixens won their pool but subsequently lost the final 50–30 to Queensland Firebirds.   

Final

Regular season 
Melbourne Vixens finished the regular season as minor premiers. After winning their first six matches, they lost to New South Wales Swifts in Round 7. They then lost three successive matches, another to Swifts and one to Northern Mystics. On 20 May in Round 8, against Mystics, Vixens were undone by Mystics defender Anna Harrison and her Harrison Hoist. Harrison made several vital blocks while being hoisted rugby union lineout-style by her defensive partners, helping Mystics secure a 49–45 win. However, Vixens successively claimed the minor premiership with three wins in the final three rounds.

Fixtures and results
Round 1

Round 2

Round 3

Round 4

Round 5

Round 6

Round 7

Round 8

Round 9

Round 10

Round 11
Melbourne Vixens received a bye.
Round 12

Round 13

Round 14

Final table

Finals

Major semi-final

Grand final

Award winners

Vixens awards

All Stars

Australian Netball Awards

References

Melbourne Vixens seasons
Melbourne Vixens